On Guns and Hunting is a collection of non-fiction outdoor literature and one short story by Donald Hamilton.

Contents
 Inside on the Rail, 7 (Outdoor Life, Jan 1955)
 The World Was Full of Quail, 15 (Outdoor Life, May 1954)
 The Geese of Still Pond, 23
 What's the Big Mystery?, 31 (Outdoor Life, Jun 1955)
 Watch My Smoke, 40 (Outdoor Life, Jul 1956)
 Arctic Hunt, 50 (American Swedish Monthly, 1961)
 The Great Swedish Älg, 65 (American Swedish Monthly, 1961)
 The Mile Gun, 74 (Sports Afield, Sep 1958, short story)
 Cottontail Carnival, 91 (Gun World, 1969)
 Afghan, Farewell, 100
 Just Want a Deer?, 104 (Outdoor Life, Jun 1961)
 Pronghorns in the Pasture, 113 (Outdoor Life, Feb 1966)
 Family Hunt, 121
 Block That Kick!, 132 (Gun Digest 22nd Edition, 1968)
 Caliber Catastrophe, 144 (Gun World, Jun 1967)
 Test Patterns Are Necessary!, 154 (Guns Magazine, 1968)
 First-Year Retriever Man, 163 (True's Hunting Yearbook No. 20, 1969, as How to put the fetch in Fido)
 Who's Minding the Store?, 176
 King of the Canadian Canyon, 186
 Excuse me, I Love Guns, 196

Publication history
1970, USA, Fawcett, Gold Medal T2299, paperback

1970 non-fiction books
Books by Donald Hamilton